Duvan-Mechetlino (Dıwan-Mäsetle) is a rural locality (a selo) and the administrative centre of Duvan-Mechetlinsky Selsoviet, Mechetlinsky District, Bashkortostan, Russia. The population was 681 as of 2010. There are 12 streets.

Geography 
Duvan-Mechetlino is located 37 km south of Bolsheustyikinskoye (the district's administrative centre) by road. Gumerovo is the nearest rural locality.

References 

Rural localities in Mechetlinsky District
Zlatoustovsky Uyezd